John Cashman may refer to:

 John Cashman (basketball), American basketball coach active in 1920s
 John Cashman (1890s hurler), Irish hurler for Blackrock and Cork
 John Cashman (hurler, born 1997), Irish hurler for Blackrock and Cork
 John Cashman (journalist), war correspondent killed in 1945 plane crash
John Cashman (rower) (born 1972), American rower
 John E. Cashman, Boeing 777 chief test pilot
 John E. Cashman (1865–1946), Wisconsin politician

See also
Jack Cashman (born 1906), Australian rules footballer